Evanton railway station was a railway station on the Inverness and Ross-shire Railway, on the  to  section. It was situated to the east of the village of Evanton.

History
The line became part of the Highland Railway on 1 February 1865, then, at grouping in 1923, it became part of the London Midland and Scottish Railway.

The station was originally opened on 23 May 1863 when it was known as "Novar". It was renamed "Evanton" on 12 June 1937 and closed to passengers on 13 June 1960. Goods facilities were withdrawn on 2 November 1964.

Proposed reopening
The proposal is also backed by the Highlands and Islands Transport Partnership, but received a setback in 2019 when Transport Scotland refused, for the second time, funding for a £15,000 feasibility study.

References

Notes

Sources

Further reading

External links
 Evanton station on a navigable 1947 O.S. map

Disused railway stations in Ross and Cromarty
Former Highland Railway stations
Railway stations in Great Britain opened in 1863
Railway stations in Great Britain closed in 1960